Hew Donald Joseph Locke (born 13 October 1959) is a British sculptor and contemporary visual artist based in Brixton, London.  In 2000 he won a Paul Hamlyn Award and the EASTinternational Award.

In 2010 he was shortlisted for the Fourth plinth, Trafalgar Square, London.  In 2015 Prince William, Duke of Cambridge dedicated Locke's public sculpture The Jurors, commissioned to commemorate 800 years since the signing of Magna Carta.

Locke has had several solo exhibitions in the UK, for example in 2005 at The New Art Gallery, Walsall and in the USA, and is regularly included in international exhibitions and Biennales. His works have been acquired by collections such as The Tate gallery, London and The Metropolitan Museum of Art, New York.  In 2016, the National Portrait Gallery in London acquired a portrait of Locke by Nicholas Sinclair. In 2022 he became a member of The Royal Academy of Arts.

Background
Born in Edinburgh, Scotland, in 1959, Locke is the eldest son of Guyanese sculptor Donald Locke (1930–2010) and British painter Leila Locke (née Chaplin) (1936–1992).  He spent his formative years (1966 to 1980) in Georgetown, Guyana, before returning to the UK to study.  He received a B.A. Fine Art degree in 1988 from Falmouth University, and an M.A. in Sculpture from the Royal College of Art, London, in 1994. In 1995 he married curator Indra Khanna.

Work and themes
Prof. Dr. Ingrid von Rosenberg has written: "(Black) Artists who continue to produce work with a critical message, like Yinka Shonibare and Hew Locke, avoid the open confrontation typical of the 1980s and instead use humour and satire, positioning themselves as cultural insiders, rather than excluded outsiders."

He has cited architecture ranging from the Baroque, Rajput, Islamic, and Caribbean vernacular to Victorian funfairs as influences. Locke uses a wide range of media, makes extensive use of found objects, and his recurrent themes include cardboard, royalty, public  statues, boats, finance and trade.

Cardboard
Locke said about misreadings of his work in his early career:  
"I would make a sculpture and people would think it was made for some festival....It was seen as being from a folk tradition, not as being of its own tradition, true to itself – as art basically...I stopped making work in colour for three years, I just dropped it."

Curator Kris Kuramitsu wrote: 
"Frustrated by the fact that his biography so heavily over-determines the reading of his work, he created a series of sculptures in which he used cardboard to preemptively package the work for the viewer. This move was revelatory for Locke's practice, as through this material he could metonymically address migration, international economics, globalisation and ideas about personal and cultural protection and projection."

Royalty
His ongoing series House of Windsor consists of portraits of members of the British royal family.

He has said: "People ask me why I'm working on pictures of the royal family....They expect me to be angry, but I don't see the point.  If you're going to fight in Iraq, then you're going to fight for Queen and Country.  When you hand in your passport, you see that you are in fact a subject of the Queen.  My work is a weird kind of acceptance of that situation."

"My feelings about the Royal Family are ambivalent. I am simply fascinated by the institution and its relationship to the press and public. My political position is neither republican nor monarchist."

Statues
In an interview with Simon Grant, Locke said "the legacy of empire is all around us on a daily basis – not just the variety of ethnic backgrounds that we have living in the UK, but the buildings and public statues that you see in cities across the country that came into being out of the economy of empire."

Locke often works over photographs of specific statues, covering areas with painted or collaged designs. The press release for his work Restoration describes "Hew Locke’s embellishment, directly on to the photographic print, interrupts our expectation that the surface of the photographic image should be left pristine. We can only guess at what lies beneath ...It is perhaps the image of Colston that is most haunting. He is adorned with cowrie shells and other trade beads ... we are made aware of his ... involvement in the uncomfortable truths of corrupt African Kingdoms selling their people ... Locke views this work as an act of 'mindful vandalism', an exploration of these characters who he finds both attractive and repellent."

Locke said: "When travelling around Britain, the first things I’m looking for are the statues ... I often think 'why have they got a statue to this person and why to that person?' ... On a purely aesthetic level I often find these historical monuments beautiful and have a genuine respect for their skilled academic sculptors. I have a somewhat schizophrenic response.  It is not an anti-military critique, but an investigation into the idea of the Hero, and a meditation on our relationship with monumental public sculpture."

Boats
Ships have been a constant theme in his work throughout his career, ranging from small paintings to installations filling a church nave or an installation across an entire battle ship.

He has said: "I have a deep personal compulsion to make at least one boat every two years or so.   It is part of my personal history, having sailed to and from Guyana to England as a child."

Curator Zoe Lukov has written: "Locke offers us a maritime procession – at once celebratory and funereal – that is animated by the sub-marine pulse of history...a synthesis of symbols from intertwined historical and cultural legends and narratives...disparate legacies that surf the waves."

Finance and trade
Curator Amanda Sanfilippo of Fringe Projects, Miami, wrote that Locke "utilizes share certificates ... to embody the history and global movement of money, power and ownership. Since the financial crash of 2008, Hew Locke has been acquiring original antique share certificates and applying paint to their surfaces. Locke ... often highlights historical and economic cycles, the machinations of global currency and exchange. ... Figures representative of the local population in the areas in which the companies operated are sometimes seen breaking-through. These are silent witnesses, those who paid the most to create the wealth without receiving the benefit...This work... is also a wry acknowledgement of the commodity value of contemporary art."

Art Daily reported that his 2017 work Cui Bono "refers to the wealth that maritime trade brought to Bremen’s merchants. The search for wealth, violent conquest and a desire for safety are factors that for centuries have driven the global movement of people...(it) is a post-colonial incentive to grapple with Bremen’s maritime commercial and colonial history."

Selected solo exhibitions and presentations
 2000: Hemmed In Two, The Victoria and Albert Museum, London
 2002: The Cardboard Palace, Chisenhale Gallery, London
 2004: House of Cards, Luckman Gallery, California State Uni & Atlanta Contemporary Art Center, USA
 2004: King Creole, installation on facade of Tate Britain & at BBC New Media Village, London
 2005: Hew Locke, The New Art Gallery, Walsall
 2006: Restoration, St Thomas the Martyr's Church, Bristol
 2008: The Kingdom of the Blind, Rivington Place, London
 2011: For Those in Peril on the Sea, St. Mary & St. Eanswythe church, Folkestone Triennial
 2015: The Tourists, HMS Belfast, London
 2019: Hew Locke; Here's the Thing, Ikon Gallery, Birmingham, Kemper Museum in Kansas City & Colby College Museum in Maine
 2022: The Procession, Duveen Hall Commission, Tate Britain, London
 2022: Foreign Exchange, temporary public sculpture co-inciding with The Commonwealth Games, Birmingham, UK
 2022: Gilt, Facade Commission at The Metropolitan Museum of Art, New York

Monographs
 Hew Locke, Walsall, UK: The New Art Gallery Walsall, 2005, 
 How Do You Want Me?, Paris, France: Editions Janninck, 2009, 
 Stranger in Paradise, London, UK: Black Dog, 2011, 
 Here's the Thing, Birmingham, UK: Ikon Gallery, Kemper Museum of Contemporary Art & Colby College Museum of Art, 2019,

References

External links

 
 , University of Miami
 Hew Locke at Tate Britain. The artist talks about his piece The Procession
 BP Artists Talk: Hew Locke, in conversation with Marcus Verhagen at Tate Britain site
 BP Artists Talk: Hew Locke, in conversation with Gus Casley-Halford at Birmingham 2022 Festival

 

1959 births
Living people
20th-century British sculptors
21st-century sculptors
Academics of Camberwell College of Arts
Alumni of Falmouth University
Alumni of the Royal College of Art
Artists from Edinburgh
Black British artists
British contemporary artists
Guyanese painters
Guyanese sculptors
People from Georgetown, Guyana
Scottish contemporary artists
Scottish male sculptors
Scottish sculptors